George Gerbier d'Ouvilly (fl. 1661) was a Dutch soldier, dramatist and translator. He was the son Sir Balthazar Gerbier, and, like him, had William Craven, 1st Earl of Craven as a patron.

He joined Lord Craven's regiment in the Low Countries, and rose to be a captain. At the English Restoration of 1660 he was residing in London.

Works
Gerbier d'Ouvilly wrote:

A tragi-comedy The False Favourite Disgrac'd, and the Reward of Loyalty, 12mo, London, 1657, not acted.
Prosopagraphia, or some Select Pourtraitures and Lives of Ancient and Modern Illustrious Personages, forming the third part of William Lee's edition of Thomas North's Plutarch,London, 1657; translations of biographies from the French of André Thévet.
Il Trionfo d'Inghilterra overo Racconto et Relatione delle Solennità fatte & osservate nella … Incoronatione … di Carlo Secondo … nel terzo giorno di Maggio, 1661, Venice, 1661.

Notes

 
Attribution
 

Year of birth missing
Year of death missing
Dutch male dramatists and playwrights
Dutch translators
17th-century Dutch dramatists and playwrights